The BBC Radio 4 programme Desert Island Discs invites castaways to choose eight pieces of music, a book (in addition to the Bible – or a religious text appropriate to that person's beliefs – and the Complete Works of Shakespeare) and a luxury item that they would take to an imaginary desert island, where they will be marooned indefinitely. The rules state that the chosen luxury item must not be anything animate or indeed anything that enables the castaway to escape from the island, for instance a radio set, sailing yacht or aeroplane. The luxury was not introduced to the programme until after about 100 programmes and the book after about 400 programmes. The choices of book and luxury can sometimes give insight into the guest's life, and the choices of guests between 1951 and 1960 are listed here.

1951

1952

  Chose as one of his records a football commentary by Raymond Glendenning of Bolton Wanderers versus Chelsea F.C., 2 June 1945.

1953

  Allowed 10 discs, due to time allowances.

1954

  2nd appearance

1955

1956

1957

1958

1959

1960

References

Episodes (1951-1960)
1950s in the United Kingdom
Desert
1960s in the United Kingdom
1960s in British music